Ernest Merlin (5 September 1886 – 10 March 1959) was a British cyclist. He competed in two events at the 1912 Summer Olympics.

References

External links
 

1886 births
1959 deaths
British male cyclists
Olympic cyclists of Great Britain
Cyclists at the 1912 Summer Olympics
People from Clerkenwell
Cyclists from Greater London